The 2002 BMW Open was a men's tennis tournament played on outdoor clay courts in Munich, Germany and was part of the International Series of the 2002 ATP Tour. The tournament was held from 29 April until 5 May 2002. Sixth-seeded Younes El Aynaoui won the singles title.

Finals

Singles

 Younes El Aynaoui defeated  Rainer Schüttler 6–4, 6–4
 It was El Aynaoui's 3rd title of the year and the 5th of his career.

Doubles

 Petr Luxa /  Radek Štěpánek defeated  Petr Pála /  Pavel Vízner 6–0, 6–7(4–7), [11–9]
 It was Luxa's only title of the year and the 2nd of his career. It was Štěpánek's only title of the year and the 5th of his career.

References

External links
 Official website 
 Official website 
 ATP tournament profile

 
BMW Open
Bavarian International Tennis Championships
April 2002 sports events in Europe
May 2002 sports events in Europe